Sir Thomas More and Family is a lost painting by Hans Holbein the Younger, painted circa 1527 and known from a number of surviving copies.

The original was destroyed in 1752 in a fire at Schloss Kremsier (Kroměříž Castle), the Moravian residence of Carl von Liechtenstein, archbishop of Olmutz.

A study by Holbein for the painting survives in the Kunstmuseum Basel (Öffentliche Kunstsammlung Basel, Kupferstichkabinett Inv. 1662.31). The work is also preserved in a number of sixteenth-century versions by Rowland Lockey, including those in Nostell Priory and the National Portrait Gallery (formerly part of the Lenthall pictures).

Strong calls it "arguably the greatest and most innovative work of his English period" and "the earliest portrait conversation piece in English painting, at least a century ahead of its time" and asserts that "its destruction means we lost the greatest single visual artefact to epitomize the aims and ideals of the early Renaissance in England."

NPG version
Sir Thomas More and Family in the National Portrait Gallery is a painting that was once part of the Lenthall pictures.

The picture
Sir Thomas More and Family is one of two near life-size copies by Rowland Lockey of an original by Holbein that was lost in a fire in the 18th century. It is dated 1593; Holbein died in 1554. It was probably commissioned by More's grandson, Thomas More II, to commemorate five generations of the family. The National Portrait Gallery lists the sitters as:
Elizabeth Dauncey (née More) (1506–1564), Second daughter of Sir Thomas More. 
Cecily Heron (née More) (born 1507–?), Youngest daughter of Sir Thomas More.  
Anne More (née Cresacre) (1511–1577), Wife of John More, son of Sir Thomas More. 
Cresacre More (1572–1649), Great-grandson and biographer of Sir Thomas More.
Sir John More (circa 1451–1530), Judge; father of Sir Thomas More. 
John More (1510–1547), Son of Sir Thomas More. 
John More (1557–1599?), Eldest son of Thomas More II. 
Maria More (née Scrope) (1534–1607), Wife of Thomas More II.  
Sir Thomas More (1478–1535). 
Thomas More II (1531–1606), Grandson of Sir Thomas More. 
Margaret Roper (1505–1544), Daughter of Sir Thomas More.

The copy from the Lenthall collection has been described as “the most accomplished extant version”.

The surviving drawing by Holbein confirms the general accuracy of the picture.

Provenance
The painting had been at Gubbins in Hertfordshire. At some time it came into the possession of the Lenthall family, but how this happened is not known, although it may have been borrowed from the More family and never returned. In the 17th century, John Aubrey viewed it at the Besselsleigh home of Sir John Lenthall, but by 1727 it was at Burford Priory. It was discussed in detail by John Loveday who saw it in 1736. The painting was unsold in a small sale of the Lenthall pictures in 1808 but was offered again and sold in a major sale in 1833. It was subsequently owned by Walter Strickland, CW Dormer, Sir Hugh Lane, Viscount Lee, and EJ Horniman whose widow bequeathed it to the National Portrait Gallery where it remains. It was the centre piece in the exhibition, The King's Good Servant, at the National Portrait Gallery in 1977.

Nostell Priory version

The version at Nostell Priory is described as "the only faithful, same-size representation of the lost original" and is inscribed “Rolandus Lockey/fecit a.d." dated 1592.
Regarding the Nostell version of Thomas More and his family, it is unclear who the artist was, who commissioned it or who originally owned it. A radiocarbon dating test was carried out on 1982 which concluded the flax to be no later than 1520.
For this reason, it is highly likely that it predates the NPG Roland Lockey version of 1593. Lockey was known as an excellent copyist, but his sitters' faces are lacking subtle character details. Those of the Nostell version—which includes all the sitters—closely resemble the heads of the original Holbein study now preserved in Windsor Castle. The Holbein head studies were acquired by Lord Arundel when he cleared out Holbein's workshop in 1546. It was Lord Arundel's family who later sold the original lost Holbein in 1654, but how they obtained it is unclear.
The art connoisseur of the period Van Mander records that a life-sized portrait by Holbein of Thomas More and his family was owned by Andries de Loo, an avid Holbein collector. He records also that a member of the More family on de Loos's death purchased this same portrait [1590]. This story is also confirmed by the art historian George Virtue, recorded in 1731, referring to the portrait now identified as the Nostell version.
This makes sense if there were in fact two versions done by Holbein. The book above Judge John More's right shoulder is Boethius’s Consolation of Philosophy in which the story parallels Thomas More's arrest and execution, suggesting that the Nostell version reflects More's execution in 1535. It could just be that Holbein was asked by Thomas Cromwell to make a propaganda piece to go with the Great Bible of 1538, Thomas More representing the old order and Cromwell the new.

Other versions
A cabinet miniature version of this portrait c. 1594 with different details, also likely to be by Lockey, is in the Victoria and Albert Museum.

Two further copies of the Holbein, at old Chelsea Town Hall (formerly one of the Petre Pictures) and Hendred House, East Hendred, may be by Lockey, but are too damaged and over-painted for any certainty to be possible.

Cultural influences

The painting is described in Wolf Hall, a historical novel by Hilary Mantel about the rise to power of Thomas Cromwell that won the 2009 Man Booker Prize:

See also
List of paintings by Hans Holbein the Younger
Lost artworks

References

1520s paintings
English paintings
More family
Group portraits by German artists
Lost paintings
Paintings in the National Portrait Gallery, London
Paintings in the collection of the Victoria and Albert Museum